Francisco "Fran" Sol Ortiz (born 13 March 1992) is a Spanish professional footballer who plays for Málaga CF on loan from Ukrainian club FC Dynamo Kyiv as a forward.

He played for Real Madrid and Villarreal early in his career, spending nearly all of that time out on loan or in reserve teams. He had 2 successful years with Willem II of the Dutch Eredivisie, totalling 88 matches and 47 goals.

Club career

Real Madrid
Born in Madrid, Sol joined Real Madrid's youth system in July 2002 at the age of 10, and began playing with the Alevín B-team. In the 2010–11 season, he made his senior debut with Real Madrid C, in a match against CF Trival Valderas in the Tercera División.

For the 2012–13 campaign, Sol was loaned to CD Lugo. He made his professional debut on 25 August 2012, coming on as a substitute for Mauro Quiroga in the 77th minute of a 1–1 away draw against UD Las Palmas. Early into the following month, he made his first start in the Segunda División, helping his team to the same result at Sporting de Gijón.

On 14 December 2012, Sol scored the 3–2 game winner against Real Madrid Castilla. On 16 January of the following year, however, his loan spell was ended and he joined Real Oviedo of the Segunda División B, in the same situation. He made his debut with the Asturians on 20 January 2013, replacing Diego Cervero for the last minutes of the away match against CF Fuenlabrada.

Villarreal
Sol moved to Villarreal CF's reserves on 2 July 2014. On 25 April 2015, he appeared in his first competitive game with the Valencians' main squad, replacing Jaume Costa in a 0–0 La Liga draw at Real Sociedad.

Willem II
Sol moved abroad for the first time on 25 June 2016, signing a three-year deal at Eredivisie club Willem II and scoring on his debut on 6 August, a 1–4 home defeat to SBV Vitesse; two weeks later he netted the winner in a 2–1 victory at AFC Ajax, his team's first win there in history.

In October 2017, Sol underwent an operation to remove a testicular tumour. The following 10 March, he scored a hat-trick in a 5–0 win over league leaders PSV Eindhoven at the Koning Willem II Stadion, putting him on top of the season's goalscoring charts.

Sol scored another three goals on 26 August 2018 in a victory by the same score over Heracles Almelo. Across his 30-month stay in the Netherlands he was the top flight's highest goalscorer with 39, five ahead of nearest rival Luuk de Jong.

Dynamo Kyiv
In January 2019, Sol signed for FC Dynamo Kyiv of the Ukrainian Premier League for an estimated €3 million fee. He made his debut on 14 February away to Olympiacos F.C. in the last 32 of the UEFA Europa League, starting in a 2–2 draw. On his maiden league appearance 11 days later, he scored in a 5–0 home win over FC Zorya Luhansk. His debut season was ended in the next match against FC Desna Chernihiv, due to a shoulder injury.

Sol returned to Spain and its second division on 2 October 2020, after agreeing to a one-year loan contract with CD Tenerife. The following 7 July, he moved to SD Eibar in the same league also in a temporary deal. Used almost equally as a starter and substitute, he scored five goals – including two in a 3–1 victory at Málaga CF on 23 April 2022 while playing 14 minutes– as the Basques made the play-off semi-finals.

On 6 July 2022, Sol was loaned for a third time to a side in his country's second division, this time Málaga.

Personal life
Sol learned four foreign languages: French, Dutch, English and Russian. A fan of science fiction literature, he wrote his own novel in 2020 titled Madrid 2035, in which the protagonist is a former tennis player.

Career statistics

Honours
Dynamo Kyiv
Ukrainian Premier League: 2020–21
Ukrainian Cup: 2019–20
Ukrainian Super Cup: 2020

References

External links

1992 births
Living people
Spanish footballers
Footballers from Madrid
Association football forwards
La Liga players
Segunda División players
Segunda División B players
Tercera División players
Real Madrid C footballers
CD Lugo players
Real Oviedo players
Villarreal CF B players
Villarreal CF players
CD Tenerife players
SD Eibar footballers
Málaga CF players
Eredivisie players
Willem II (football club) players
Ukrainian Premier League players
FC Dynamo Kyiv players
Spanish expatriate footballers
Expatriate footballers in the Netherlands
Expatriate footballers in Ukraine
Spanish expatriate sportspeople in the Netherlands
Spanish expatriate sportspeople in Ukraine